Epacris rhombifolia commonly known as mountain coral heath, is a plant in the heath family Ericaceae and is endemic to eastern Australia. It is an erect, multi-stemmed shrub with broad, rhombic leaves and white flowers with four petals, the flowers spreading down the branches. It only grows in wet, subalpine heath and is sometimes regarded as a variety of Epacris microphylla.

Description
The young stems are reddish-brown and covered with short, soft, downy hairs when young.

Taxonomy and naming
Mountain coral heath was first formally described in 1810 by Lilian Fraser and Joyce Vickery, who gave it the name Epacris microphylla var. rhombifolia. The description was published in Journal and Proceedings of the Linnean Society of New South Wales. The variety was raised to species level in 2015 by Yvonne Menadue and Ron Crowden. The specific epithet (rhombifolia) is derived from the Latin words rhombus meaning "an equilateral parallelogram with unequal pairs of
angles" and folium meaning "leaf".

Distribution and habitat
Epacris rhombifolia grows in wet heath in subalpine areas of Lake Mountain, Mount Baw Baw and the ranges north of Licola in Victoria and in the Barrington Tops, Wingello and Oberon districts of New South Wales.

Use in horticulture
Mountain coral heath has horticultural merit with its display of dainty flowers. It is suitable for a small, permanently moist, sheltered garden and can be grown in containers.

References

rhombifolia
Ericales of Australia
Flora of New South Wales
Flora of Victoria (Australia)
Plants described in 1810